Balcı is a Turkish name meaning "apiarist" or "beekeeper" and may refer to:

People
 Serkan Balcı (born 1983), Turkish footballer
 Serhat Balcı (born 1982), Turkish wrestler
 Şükrü Balcı (1929–1993), Turkish police chief and civil servant
 Tamer Balci (1917–1993), Turkish actor

Places
 Balcı, Bor, a village in the district of Bor, Niğde Province, Turkey
 Balcı, Borçka, a village in the district of Borçka, Artvin Province
 Balcı, Gönen, a village
 Balcı, Ilgaz
 Balcı, Ortaköy, small town in Aksaray Province, Turkey

See also
 Balcılar (disambiguation), the plural form

Turkish-language surnames